Anjum, Anjom, Anjuman or Anjoman, meaning a gathering or society, may refer to:

Organisations
 Anjoman-e Okhovat, a Freemason-like mystical society rooted in Sufism in Iran
 Anjuman-i-Himayat-i-Islam, an Islamic intellectual and political organisation based in Lahore, Pakistan
 Anjuman-i-Ulama-i-Bangala, defunct Islamic organisation based in British Bengal
 Anjuman Khudam-ul-Quran, a Muslim educational organisation on the Indian subcontinent
 Anjuman (Parsis), the Parsi–Zoroastrian associations that have the authority to manage a Tower of Silence in India
 Anjuman Sunnat-ul-Jamaat Association, a Muslim organisation of Trinidad and Tobago
 Anjuman Taraqqi-i-Urdu, an organisation for the promotion of Urdu language, Urdu literature and Indian Muslim cultural heritage
 Anjuvannam, a medieval merchant guild of West Asian traders (Jews, Syrian Christians, and Muslims) in south India and South East Asia
 Deendar Anjuman, an Islamic organization based in Hyderabad, India
 Aḥmadiyyah Anjuman-i Ishāʿat-i Islām Lahore, a branch, sect, or faction of the Ahmadiyyah Movement that emerged after a schismatic split occurred around 1914

People
 Anjuman (actress) (born 1955), Pakistani actress
 Nadia Anjuman (1980–2005), Afghan poet and journalist
 Anjuman Shehzadi (1977–2011), Pakistani stage and film actress

Places
 Anjuman Pass in Afghanistan
 Anjuman Valley in Afghanistan
 Anjuman (stream), through that valley
 Anjuman, Afghanistan, a village in Afghanistan
 Anjuman-i-Khurd, another village in Afghanistan
 Anjoman, Iran, a village in Kohgiluyeh and Boyer-Ahmad Province, Iran
 Anjoman-e Olya, a village in Zanjan Province, Iran
 Anjoman-e Sofla, a village in Zanjan Province, Iran

Films
 Anjuman (1970 film), a 1970 Pakistani Urdu film starring Waheed Murad and Rani
 Anjuman (2013 film), a 2013 Pakistani Urdu film starring Imran Abbas Naqvi and Sara Loren
 Anjuman (1986 film), a Hindi film directed by Muzaffar Ali starring Shabana Azmi and Farooq Shaikh